The 2013 Little India riot took place on 8 December 2013 after a fatal accident occurred at SST 21:23 at the junction of Race Course Road and Hampshire Road in Little India, Singapore, causing angry mobs of passers-by to attack the bus involved and emergency vehicles that had by then arrived at the location. About 300 migrant labourers were involved in the riot which lasted for around two hours. This was the second riot in post-independence Singapore, and the first in 44 years since the 1969 race riots.

Riot
The riot continued for approximately two hours, and the situation was brought under control before midnight. Officers from the Special Operations Command (SOC) and Gurkha Contingent were deployed. An estimated 300 police officers were dispatched to deal with the rioting. A witness reported that rioters at the scene were intoxicated with alcohol and threw beer bottles.

By 23:45, all rioters had dispersed to the surrounding areas.

Timeline of events

Aftermath

Twenty-five emergency vehicles were damaged in the riots, alongside five that were set on fire. Video footage uploaded on the Internet shows rioters pushing police cars on their sides and setting an ambulance on fire. 39 police, four civil defence and auxiliary officers were injured.

Early estimates put the number of rioters at 400, later reduced to 300 in the aftermath of the riot. The Singapore Police Force dispatched 300 riot police. The police made 27 arrests in relation to the riots. In a police statement released to the media on 9 December, it was specified that of those arrested, 24 were migrant labourers from India, two were migrant labourers from Bangladesh and one was a Singaporean permanent resident. Subsequent investigations revealed that the two Bangladeshis and the Singaporean permanent resident were not involved in the incident.

From 11 to 14 December 2013, nine more labourers from Tamil Nadu were similarly charged in court for their involvement in the riot. Three were charged on 11 December, four on 12 December, and two on 14 December, bringing the total charged to 33. On 10 February 2014, an Indian construction worker was sentenced to 15 weeks imprisonment on charges related to riots. On 2 October 2014, a man was sentenced to 25 months imprisonment with three strokes of the cane for flipping a police car. On 2 December 2014, a construction worker was sentenced to a year's imprisonment for assaulting a police officer during the riot.

In addition, 53 workers were deported for offences ranging from obstructing the police to failing to follow police orders to disperse, while 200 workers received formal advisories to obey the law.

The riot eventually led to the implementation of a new law, the Liquor Control (Supply and Consumption) Act in 2015 banning consumption of alcohol in all public places from 10:30 pm to 7 am. This also included banning the sales of alcohol products such as Rum and Raisin ice cream between the time periods, which was lifted in 2019.

Investigation
According to a statement from the Singapore Police Force, the riots broke out shortly after a fatal road traffic accident between a private bus and a pedestrian at 21:23 SST, at the junction of Race Course Road and Hampshire Road. The victim was identified as Sakthivel Kumaravelu, a 33-year-old construction worker from Tamil Nadu, India. Sakthivel succumbed to his injuries and was pronounced dead at the scene.

The Singapore authorities commissioned a Committee of Inquiry to study the reasons for the riot and its handling, as well as to review the government's management of areas where foreign workers congregate.

The 55-year-old Singaporean bus driver who caused the fatal traffic accident was not found to be at fault, and was acquitted. The subsequent riots that led to the 27 arrests were classified by the Singapore police under rioting with dangerous weapons.

Preliminary investigations found that Sakthivel, while intoxicated, attempted to board the private bus, which was believed to be ferrying foreign workers to the Avery Lodge dormitory. The bus driver requested assistance from a female time-keeper, who was from the Singapore School Transport Association and was responsible for handling transport arrangements, to get Sakthivel to alight, as the latter was causing trouble. The accident occurred shortly after Sakthivel alighted from the bus.

Reactions

Domestic
Singapore's Prime Minister, Lee Hsien Loong, stated that the police will "spare no effort to identify the culprits and deal with them with the full force of the law". Later, he told Singaporeans to refrain from negative comments against migrant workers. The country's Deputy Prime Minister, Teo Chee Hean, similarly stated that no effort will be spared in capturing the perpetrators.

Then Transport Minister Lui Tuck Yew, who was also a member of parliament for that district, wrote on Facebook that he would consider limiting the sale of liquor within Little India. A temporary ban on the sale and consumption of alcohol in Little India was in effect during the weekend of 14–15 December; followed by an extension of the ban for 6 months until 24 June 2014 and covered mostly parts of the Central Business District. Since May 2014, a total ban of alcohol with closing of night schools and limitation of nightlife areas took effect.

The incident has also raised debate online by Singaporeans on the issues of overcrowding and increasing numbers of migrant workers in Singapore. It also highlighted ongoing ethnic tensions within Singapore, rising income inequality, the country's heavy reliance on foreign labour, and the working conditions of migrant workers. The Singapore authorities have called for calm and warned against speculations.

Mainstream media outlets praised and made public appeals to trace a man and other bystanders who attempted to stop the riots, which was captured on video and uploaded to YouTube. The man in the video footage was initially identified as Thangaval Govindarasu, 38, from Tamil Nadu, after he came forward following appeals for the identity of the man. However, he later claimed he was not the man in the video, although he did attempt to stop the rioting. A coffee shop owner in Little India later claimed that he recognised the man in the footage as a regular customer from Chennai. However, he declined to divulge the name of the customer, and stated he is unaware of where the man worked.

International
 – Bangladesh's High Commissioner to Singapore, Mahbubuz Zaman, was reported as saying that "the news reports that appeared on a section of media and news involving a Bangladeshi worker is not based on facts", and called for the co-operation of the Bangladeshi community with the Singapore authorities.

 – A news report by India's Sun TV on 9 December 2013 attracted strong reactions and controversy in Singapore for erroneously reporting that the deceased was pushed out of the bus by the driver, as well as attacked by locals. In response to protests from Lim Thuan Kuan, Singapore's High Commissioner to India, Sun TV issued a correction the following day and apologised for the error.

See also
List of riots in Singapore
Pingat Perkhidmatan Operasi Home Team

References

External links
The Committee of Inquiry's report on the riots, released on 27/06/2014

2013 in Singapore
2013 riots
December 2013 crimes in Asia
December 2013 events in Asia
Race riots in Singapore
2013 crimes in Singapore